Seven is the 7th studio album by American rock band Enuff Z'Nuff, which was originally released in Japan as Brothers under the band name Chip & Donnie in 1994. Seven  was initially intended to form one half of a double-album for the Japanese market, paired with the record that would eventually become the album Tweaked. The sessions were split into two separate discs, with the pop sounding Brothers album getting re-branded as an Enuff Z'nuff album in 1997 for its US release. As well as the re-titling and new artwork, Seven contains two bonus tracks not available on the original Brothers CD.

On Seven, the band adopted a more acoustic sound compared to Tweaked, which may be seen as its heavier counterpart. Several tracks on the album are also significant to the band's history:

"Down Hill" is thought by lead singer Donnie Vie to possibly contain late guitarist Derek Frigo's last studio recorded solo with the band. "You and I" was played by Donnie Vie at bassist Chip Z’nuff's wedding reception. "It’s No Good," an acoustic concert staple, was later re-recorded by and featured on Donnie Vie's solo album, Extra Strength. Other notable tracks are the lead single "Wheels," which was covered in 1998 by Arista recording artists The Tuesdays and the John Lennon cover "Jealous Guy". Liner notes for the album were written by Rolling Stone editor, David Wild.

Causing some confusion, Seven was later re-released in the US  under its original Japanese title Brothers, featuring new artwork and the Enuff Z'Nuff name. The Brothers re-issue is the same as the original Chip & Donnie Japanese release of 1994, meaning the bonus tracks from Seven are no longer present.

Track listing
All songs by Donnie Vie, except where indicated
 "Wheels" (Vie, Chip Z'Nuff) – 4:32
 "Still Have Tonight" – 3:47
 "Down Hill" – 4:44
 "It’s No Good" – 3:42
 "5 Smiles Away" – 3:18
 "L.A. Burning" (Vie, Z'nuff) – 3:03
 "New Kind of Motion" (Vie, Z'nuff) – 3:16
 "Clown on the Town" – 4:26
 "You And I" – 4:35
 "On My Way Back Home" – 4:40
 "We Don't Have to Be Friends" (Vie, Z'nuff) – 4:05
 "So Sad to See You" – 4:41
 "Jealous Guy" (John Lennon) – 4:06 (bonus track)
 "For You Girl" – 3:26 (US bonus track)
 "I Won't Let You Go" – 4:02 (US bonus track)

Personnel
Enuff Z'Nuff
Donnie Vie – lead vocals, guitars and keyboards
Chip Z'Nuff – bass guitar, guitars and vocals
Johnny Monaco – lead guitar 
Ricky Parent – drums

Additional musicians
Derek Frigo (alias Kurt Fang) – lead guitar (tracks 1, 2, 3, 8 & 10)
Eugene Strentz (Gino Martino) – lead guitar (track 9)
Bruce Breckenfield – Hammond B-3 organ
Gregg Errico – drums
Mars Williams – saxophone
Johnny Frigo – violin
The Party Girls – background vocals (track 7)

Production
Chris Shepard – recording & mixing
Phil Bonanno, Stefon Taylor, Dan Stout, Chris Demonk, Don Grayless, Bub Phillipe, Johnny K, Jeff Lane, Joshua Shapard, Jim Hoffman – additional engineering
Jeff Lane, Kevin Hayes, Dan Stout, Claudine Pontier, Tom Lipnick – assistant engineers
Eric Gast – additional mixing
Brian Lee – mastering

Release history

References

External links
Heavy Harmonies page
Official Website

Enuff Z'nuff albums
1997 albums
Music for Nations albums